The St. Francis deSales Church in Geneva, New York was established in 1832.

Its principal church was built in 1864.  Its complex built over 10 years beginning in 1864 reflects the rapid growth of the city's Catholic population.

A historic district of four buildings was nominated in 2015 for listing on the National Register of Historic Places.

The district was listed on the National Register of Historic Places as St. Francis de Sales Parish Complex in 2015.  The listing includes 94, 110, 130 & 140 Exchange St. in Geneva.  These are the church, a rectory/church office, a former
school, and a convent/office building.

According to its National Register nomination, thechurch is a large Gothic Revival building with some Romanesque details (rounded corbeling and rounded windows) and a large four stage steeple with a tall spire at the southeast end. The rectory is a two and one-half story brick Second Empire building built ca. 1868 with a mansard roof that was expanded in 1890. The school was also expanded; it was originally built in 1874 in the Italianate style and significantly enlarged in 1909, retaining the same detailing but removing a central bell tower. The convent to the school's north is a two and one-half story brick building built in 1874. It retains some Italianate features, but in 1910, a new roof, decorative features, entrance and a substantial rear expansion gave it the form and feeling of a Colonial Revival style building.

Since 2007, the church has been part of merged larger parish, the Our Lady of Peace parish, with two churches, the St. Francis de Sales and the St. Stephen Church at 48 Pulteney Street in Geneva.

References

External links
Our Lady of Peace, Geneva, New York, official site

National Register of Historic Places in Ontario County, New York
Catholic churches in the United States
Buildings and structures completed in 1864
Churches on the National Register of Historic Places in New York (state)
Roman Catholic churches completed in 1864
Gothic Revival church buildings in New York (state)